Armor All is an American brand of car care products that is manufactured by American company Armored AutoGroup of Danbury, Connecticut, United States. The company markets the product line of sprays, gels, liquids, and wipes to clean, shine, and protect interior and exterior automobile surfaces.

According to patent documents, Armor All typically contains water, PDMS (silicone), diethylene glycol, glycerin, and various additional chemical compounds.

Background and history

1970s
The company that became Armor All was started in 1972 by entrepreneur and marketer Alan Rypinski, when Rypinski purchased the marketing rights for the product Trid-on (a name derived from no dirt spelled backward) from inventor Joe Palcher who along with Byron F. Quivey in 1966 a wheelwright in Santa Ana, began selling the product on Main street at his shop. It quickly grew in popularity selling through periodicals like Hot Rod Magazine. Rypinski then patented, rebranded, and marketed Trid-on as Armor All. The first test products were called RT-10 and GT-10. In 1979, Rypinski sold all of the rights to the Armor All brand name and protectant to the San Francisco-based consumer products company McKesson Corporation.

1980s
By 1987, Armor All's sales exceeded $100 million and company profits grew to $17 million, and in 1988 Armor All purchased Borden, Inc.'s car care products line, which included well-known name brands such as Rain Dance, Rally, and No. 7. This acquisition significantly broadened the company's product line, which increased the company's gains through 1989. By 1990, the company's net income dropped to less than $20 million, and then sharply worsened to less than $7 million in 1991.

1990s
Sales climbed from a 1990s low of $134 million in 1993 to $217 million in 1995 (fiscal year ended March 31, 1995), as net income climbed back toward $25 million. For the remainder of the decade, Armor All developed the Armor All brand name with a focus on international growth and the introduction of new products.

Nielsen CDG UK was appointed car care distributor for Armor All products by Clorox UK. Nielsen CDG is part of the Convenience Distribution Group supplying petrol (gasoline) stations in the United Kingdom.

Present

In 2010, Clorox sold Armor All and STP to Avista Capital Partners. It named the business Armored AutoGroup. In 2008, Armor All released a complete line of automotive vacuums. In April 2015, the Armored AutoGroup was acquired by Spectrum Brands. Energizer bought the Spectrum Brands auto care business unit (including Armor All, STP and A/C Pro) for $1.25 billion in cash and stock.

References

External links
Armor All homepage
Armor All MSDS-Material Safety Data Sheets
Armored Autogroup dated after Jan. 2011
The Clorox Company dated before Jan. 2011

Companies based in Oakland, California
Automotive companies of the United States
Chemical companies of the United States
Energizer Holdings
Chemical companies established in 1972
1972 establishments in California